Parliamentary elections were held in Chad on 14 December 1969. The country was a one-party state at the time, with the Chadian Progressive Party as the sole legal party. It therefore won all seats in the National Assembly, which was enlarged from 75 to 101 seats. Voter turnout was 95.11%.

Results

References

Chad
1969 in Chad
Elections in Chad
One-party elections